Kaspar von Stieler, also called Caspar Stieler (2 August 1632 – 24 June 1707), was a soldier-poet and later a linguist.  He expressed the feelings of the soldiers of the Thirty Years War in his poetry.

References
John G. Gagliardo. Germany Under the Old Regime, 1600–1790. New York: Longman, 1991.

1632 births
1707 deaths
Linguists of German